The men's team competition of the table tennis event at the 2007 Southeast Asian Games will be held from 3 to 5 December 2007 at the Klang Plaza in Nakhon Ratchasima, Thailand.

Schedule
All times are Thailand Time (UTC+07:00).

Results

Preliminary round

Pool 1

Pool 2

Knockout round

Semifinals

Gold medal match

References

External links
 

2007 Southeast Asian Games events
2007 in table tennis
2007